"Betcha Can't Do It Like Me" is a song by Atlanta-based hip-hop group D4L from their debut album Down for Life. It was their second and last single before disbanding in 2006. It was produced by Teriyakie Smith. It failed to match the success of their previous single, "Laffy Taffy", only peaking at number 72 on the Billboard Hot 100.

Charts

References 

2006 singles
D4L songs
2005 songs
Atlantic Records singles